The Laughery Valley Conference was an IHSAA-sanctioned conference that existed between 1941 and 1958. The conference had its footprint in the Southeast Indiana counties of Dearborn, Ohio, Ripley, and Switzerland. The conference was stable for its first 11 years, but lost three schools to the Ohio River Valley Conference within two years. The LVC folded in 1958, as two of the five members at the time consolidated, and the two Ripley County schools left joined their counterparts in the Tri-County Conference. Patriot, unable to obtain membership in the ORVC or TCC, played as an independent until it consolidated into Switzerland County in 1968.

Members

References

Indiana high school athletic conferences
High school sports conferences and leagues in the United States
Indiana High School Athletic Association disestablished conferences